Moore railway station was a station on the Grand Junction Railway, serving Runcorn in North-West England.

It opened in 1837, closing to passengers in 1943, and then completely in the early 1950s. No substantive remains exist today.  There is now a small water-fill station.  A water park named "The Station" has also been added.

The station was just south of Moore Excavation, a cutting almost one and a half miles in length.

References

Disused railway stations in Cheshire
Grand Junction Railway
Former London and North Western Railway stations
Railway stations in Great Britain opened in 1837
Railway stations in Great Britain closed in 1943